Bijender Kumar Punia is the former  Vice-Chancellor of Maharshi Dayanand University. He was appointed in 2016. Previously he was working in Guru Jambheshwar University of Science and Technology, Hisar as Professor in Department of Management. He has written many books and on Haryana the Scholars such as Muni Lal, Murli Chand Sharma, HA Phadke and Sukhdev Singh Chib believe that the name comes from a compound of the words Hari (Sanskrit Harit, "green") and Aranya (forest).

References

Living people
Academic staff of Guru Jambheshwar University of Science and Technology
Place of birth missing (living people)
Year of birth missing (living people)
Indian Hindus
Academic staff of Maharshi Dayanand University